The 26th series of The Bill, a British television drama, was the final series of the programme. The series was axed on March 26 after a fall in ratings following the controversial revamp the previous summer, and what ITV director Peter Fincham described as "the changing taste of viewers". Despite a petition and calls for another network to take on the series, the final episode, Respect: Part 2, aired on August 31 -  weeks after the 27th anniversary of the pilot Woodentop.

Nearly two years after the final episode, Supt. Jack Meadows was featured in an episode of Leipzig Homicide, which involved him investigating a suspected murderer who has been living in London. In the episode it is revealed that at some point during the year and a half following the events of Respect, Meadows had retired.

On 30 April 2014, The Bill Series 26 Part 1 & 2 DVD set was released in Australia.

Cast changes

Arrivals
 PC Kirsty Knight (Crossing the Line)
 Commander Lisa Kennedy (Red Tape)

Departures
 DC Will Fletcher (Be A Man): Transfers to Westminster CID
 Commander Lisa Kennedy (Great Responsibility - Part 2): Departed after the arrest of her son as part of a murder inquiry
 PC Nate Roberts (Death Knock): Made unexplained exit prior to series finale
 Superintendent Jack Meadows (Respect - Part 2): Last seen in series finale; revealed to have retired in 2012
 Insp Dale Smith (Respect - Part 2): Last seen in series finale
 DI Neil Manson (Respect - Part 2): Last seen in series finale
 DS Stevie Moss (Respect - Part 2): Last seen in series finale
 DS Max Carter (Respect - Part 2): Last seen in series finale
 Sgt Jo Masters (Respect - Part 2): Last seen in series finale
 Sgt Callum Stone (Respect - Part 2): Last seen in series finale
 DC Mickey Webb (Respect - Part 2): Last seen in series finale
 DC Terry Perkins (Respect - Part 2): Last seen in series finale
 DC Grace Dasari (Respect - Part 2): Last seen in series finale
 DC Jacob "Banksy" Banks (Respect - Part 2): Last seen in series finale
 PC Roger Valentine (Respect - Part 2): Last seen in series finale
 PC Kirsty Knight (Respect - Part 2): Last seen in series finale
 PC Leon Taylor (Respect - Part 2): Last seen in series finale
 PC Benjamin Gayle (Respect - Part 2): Last seen in series finale
 PC Mel Ryder (Respect - Part 2): Last seen in series finale
 CSE Eddie Olosunje (Respect - Part 2): Last seen in series finale

Episodes

References

2010 British television seasons
The Bill series